"Till You Love Me" is a song written by Bob DiPiero and Gary Burr, and recorded by American country music artist Reba McEntire.  It was released in October 1994 as the third single from her album Read My Mind.  The song reached #2 on the Billboard Hot Country Singles & Tracks chart in February 1995, behind Pam Tillis' "Mi Vida Loca (My Crazy Life)". It was also McEntire's first entry on the Billboard Hot 100, reaching #78.

Music video
The music video was directed by Jon Small, and premiered in late 1994. It is a live performance, filmed at the Omaha Civic Center in Omaha, Nebraska, which was taken from the 1994 NBC special Reba: Live!. The performance shows Reba performing the song in a light pink dress with her band.

Chart performance

Year-end charts

References

1994 singles
1994 songs
Reba McEntire songs
Songs written by Bob DiPiero
Songs written by Gary Burr
Song recordings produced by Tony Brown (record producer)
MCA Records singles